Mount Mills is a Thirteener and California 4000 meter peak, on the Sierra Crest, north of Mount Abbot and south of Mono Pass in the Sierra Nevada.

The mountain is located within the John Muir Wilderness area. The  summit marks the boundary between northwestern Inyo County and eastern Fresno County.

The Mono Recesses are to the west of Mount Mills.

History
The mountain is named in honor of Darius Ogden Mills, a banker who founded the city of Millbrae, California and the Carson and Colorado Railroad. The name appeared on the first edition of the Mt Goddard topographic map in 1912.

References 

Mountains of Fresno County, California
Mountains of Inyo County, California
Mountains of the John Muir Wilderness
North American 4000 m summits
Mountains of Northern California